Agriades pheretiades, the Tien Shan blue, is a Palearctic butterfly of the family Lycaenidae.

Subspecies
A. p. pheretiades (Saur Mountains, Tarbagatai Mountains, Dzhungarsky Alatau)
A. p. andarabi (Forster, 1937) (western Pamirs)
A. p. danya Korb, 2013 (Uzbekistan)
A. p. lara Zhdanko & Churkin, 2001 (Kyrgyzstan)
A. p. micrus (Avinoff, 1910) (eastern Pamirs)
A. p. pheres (Staudinger, 1886) (Gissar Range, Darvaz, Alay Mountains, northern and western Tian Shan)
A. p. pheretulus (Staudinger, 1886)
A. p. pseudomicrus Tshikolovets, 1997 (northern Pamirs)
A. p. sveta Zhdanko & Churkin, 2001 (Kazakhstan)
A. p. tekessanus (Alphéraky, 1897) (inner Tian Shan)
A. p. walli (Evans, 1912) (Kashmir)

References

External links

P
Butterflies of Asia
Insects of Central Asia
Tian Shan
Butterflies described in 1843